Tanyproctini is a tribe of May beetles and junebugs in the family Scarabaeidae, often historically referred to under the junior name "Pachydemini".

Selected genera
 Achloa Erichson, 1840
 Aegostheta Dejean, 1833
 Diaphylla Erichson, 1847
 Elaphocera Géné, 1836
 Pachydema Laporte, 1832
 Phobetus LeConte, 1856
 Sparrmannia Laporte, 1840
 Tanyproctus Ménétriés, 1832
 Warwickia Smith & Evans, 2005

References

Melolonthinae
Articles created by Qbugbot